Adarrial Smylie is an American former basketball player known for his collegiate career at Southern University between 1997–98 and 1999–2000. Smylie was a three-time All-Southwestern Athletic Conference selection and became the seventh back-to-back SWAC Player of the Year.

Smylie attended St. Amant High School in Ascension Parish, Louisiana from 1992 to 1996. Before enrolling at Southern to play for the Jaguars, he played junior college basketball at Pearl River Community College. After a solid career at Pearl River, Smylie went on to score 1,353 points in just three seasons at Southern. He was second in the SWAC in point per game (19.0) as a junior in 1998–99, but also finished first in field-goal percentage (.563), first in rebounding (8.9 rpg.), fourth in blocks per game (1.63) and ninth in free-throw percentage (.732). He was named the SWAC Player of the Year for the first time. Then, as a senior, he led the league in scoring (18.2 ppg) and became a repeat winner of the award.

Smylie went undrafted in the 2000 NBA Draft. He now works professionally in business.

References 

Date of birth missing (living people)
Living people
American men's basketball players
Basketball players from Louisiana
Centers (basketball)
Junior college men's basketball players in the United States
Pearl River Community College alumni
Southern Jaguars basketball players
Year of birth missing (living people)